Creeps is a 1956 short subject directed by Jules White starring American slapstick comedy team The Three Stooges (Moe Howard, Larry Fine and Shemp Howard). It is the 168th entry in the series released by Columbia Pictures starring the comedians, who released 190 shorts for the studio between 1934 and 1959.

Plot
The Stooges tell their three sons (also the Stooges) about the time they had jobs as moving men assigned to the haunted Smorgasbord Castle. All goes well until a clanking suit of armor inhabited by the ghost of Sir Tom (voiced by Phil Arnold) instructs the Stooges to leave him be. Shemp, Larry and Moe all take turns trying to move Tom but he spooks the Stooges away.

Cast

Credited
 Moe Howard as Moe/Moe Jr.
 Larry Fine as Larry/Larry Jr.
 Shemp Howard as Shemp/Shemp Jr. (final film)

Uncredited
 Phil Arnold as voice of Sir Tom
 Johnny Kascier as Sir Tom
 Jules White as voice of Red Skeleton (stock footage)

Production notes
Creeps is a remake of 1949's The Ghost Talks using ample stock footage from the original film. The new footage, filmed on May 16, 1955, includes the babies (also the Stooges) and a torture room scene where Moe's trousers are sliced off.

In the scene when Sir Tom is telling the Stooges his story, there is a brief shot added where the boys are smoking; in the next shot (a recycled clip), the boys are not smoking.

The NBC chimes are heard twice in the film, when Moe hits Shemp on his head three times, and when the Stooges hit the babies' heads with hammers.

See also
List of American films of 1956

References

External links 
 
 
Creeps at threestooges.net

1956 films
The Three Stooges films
American slapstick comedy films
American black-and-white films
Columbia Pictures short films
The Three Stooges film remakes
Films directed by Jules White
American ghost films
1956 comedy films
1950s English-language films
1950s American films